Sigmund Hagen (born 15 August 1976) is a Norwegian politician for the Socialist Left Party.

He served as a deputy representative to the Norwegian Parliament from Oppland during the term 2001–2005. In total he met during 6 days of parliamentary session.

References

1976 births
Living people
Socialist Left Party (Norway) politicians
Deputy members of the Storting
Oppland politicians
Place of birth missing (living people)
21st-century Norwegian politicians